Votto is an Italian surname. Notable people with the surname include:

Antonino Votto (1896–1985), Italian operatic conductor and vocal coach
Joey Votto (born 1983), Canadian-born baseball player

See also
Gotto

Italian-language surnames